Kivach Falls (from Karelian kiivas, "impetuous") is a 10.7-m-high cascade waterfall in Russia. It is located on the Suna River in the Kondopoga District, Republic of Karelia and gives its name to the Kivach Natural Reserve, founded in 1931.

History 

Kivach owes much of its fame to Gavrila Derzhavin, a Russian poet who was inspired by its "unruly stream" to write "Waterfall", one of the most important Russian poems of the 18th century. Many other eminent visitors followed Derzhavin to see the famed waterfall. One of these was Alexander II of Russia, who commissioned a new road to Kivach, a pavilion on the right bank of the stream and a bridge slightly downstream.

In 1936, the Soviets diverted part of the river to feed a local hydroelectric power station, which affected the waterfall negatively, while its rivals — Girvas (14.8 m) and Por-Porog (16.8 m) — were destroyed altogether. Although it is not as spectacular as it used to be, Kivach is still considered a major sight in Karelia.

References 
Information for tourists
Photographs
Kivach on the official website of Karelian government
Interactive photo with many angles

Kondopozhsky District
Waterfalls of Russia
Landforms of the Republic of Karelia
WKivach
Tourist attractions in the Republic of Karelia
Cascade waterfalls